Güzelsu (literally "beautiful water") is a Turkish place name that may refer to the following places in Turkey:

 Güzelsu, Ahlat, a village
 Güzelsu, Akseki, a village in the district of Akseki, Antalya Province
 Güzelsu, Gerger, a village in the district of Gerger, Adıyaman Province
 , a neighborhood in Gürpınar (District), Van province
 Güzelsu, Oltu